Weldford is a civil parish in Kent County, New Brunswick, Canada.

For governance purposes it is divded between the villages of Five Rivers and Nouvelle-Arcadie, which are both members of the Kent Regional Service Commission, and the Richibucto 15 Indian reserve, which is not.

Prior to the 2023 governance reform, all of the parish outside the Indian reserve formed the local service district of the parish of Weldford.

Origin of name
Weldford was a portmanteau of the names of the two Kent County Members of the Legislative Assembly in 1835, John W. Weldon and John P. Ford.

History
Weldford was erected in 1835 from Richibucto Parish.

Boundaries
Weldford Parish is bounded:

on the north by a line due west from the northernmost corner of the Richibucto 15 Indian reserve;
on the east by a line running southerly along the eastern border of the main part of the Richibucto 15 Indian reserve to the Richibucto River, downstream to the mouth of the St. Nicholas River, up the St. Nicholas and then the East Branch St. Nicholas River to the mouth of Black Brook, then southerly to the Wellington Parish line at a point west of the East Branch Road;
on the south by the prolongation of a line running south 68º west from the mouth of the Rivière Chockpish-nord;
on the west by a line running north 22º west, based on the magnet of 1867, from a point on the Westmorland County line twenty miles (32.2 kilometres) west of the northern tip of Shediac Island.

Communities
Communities at least partly within the parish; bold indicates an Indian reserve; italics indicate a name no longer in official use

Balla Philip
Bass River
Bass River Point
Beersville
Brest
Browns Yard
Bryants Corner
Cails Mills
Clairville
East Branch
Emerson
Ford Bank
Fords Mills
Jailletville
Kent Junction 
Lower Main River
Molus River
Mundleville
Normandie
Pine Ridge
Richibucto 15 (Big Cove)
Saint-Joseph
Saint-Norbert
Smiths Corner
South Branch
Targettville
Village-Saint Augustin
West Branch

Bodies of water
Bodies of water at least partly in the parish:

Bass River
Coal Branch River
Kouchibouguacis River
Molus River
Richibucto River
St. Nicholas River
Bells Creek
Big Cove Creek
Clares Creek
Gaspereau Creek
George Beers Creek
McKays Creek
Big North Fork
Little North Fork
Lac Saint-Joseph

Islands
Islands at least partly in the parish:
Jerrys Island

Other notable places
Parks, historic sites, and other noteworthy places at least partly in the parish.

 Blind Brook Protected Natural Area
 Richibucto River Protected Natural Area

Demographics
Parish population does not include Richibucto 15 Indian reserve

Population
Population trend

Language
Mother tongue (2016)

Religion
There are several Catholic churches in Weldford Parish, all belonging to the Roman Catholic Archdiocese of Moncton: 
St. Bartholomew mission in Bass River,
 Saint-Norbert in Saint-Norbert, and 
 St. Peter in South Branch.

Also there are four Presbyterian churches, belonging to Bass River Pastoral Charge, The Presbytery of New Brunswick, Synod of the Atlantic Provinces:
 St. Marks Presbyterian Church in Bass River,
 St. James Presbyterian Church in Beersville,
 St. Andrew's Presbyterian Church in Clairville, and
 Zion Presbyterian Church in West Branch.

The United Church of Canada has two congregations, belonging to Rexton Pastoral Charge, Chignecto Presbytery, Maritime Conference:
 St. Stephen's United Church in Molus River, and
 St. John's United Church in West Branch.

And there is one Anglican church, belonging to the Parish of Kent, Archdeaconry of Moncton, Diocese of Fredericton.
 St. Paul's Church in Browns Yard.

See also
List of parishes in New Brunswick

Notes

References

External links
 Weldford Local Service District Advisory Committee
New Brunswick Provincial Archives - Weldford Parish
Softball New Brunswick Championship Results
Richibucto River Association
Kent County Gen web
West Branch Days featured on Ruby Cusack
Eleanor Wilson Graham Middle School
The Green Festival
Biography Willi Nolan
Krista Betts receives Award
Wild Heart of Kent

Local service districts of Kent County, New Brunswick
Geography of Kent County, New Brunswick